Eva Donde (born October 17, 1989) is a Kenyan swimmer, who specialized in sprint freestyle events. She held Kenyan records in long and short course 50 m freestyle, until they were both broken by Achieng Ajulu-Bushell in 2009. Donde is also a member of Otter Club, and is trained by her longtime coach Whitney Pragassa.

Donde qualified for the women's 50 m freestyle, as a 14-year-old, at the 2004 Summer Olympics in Athens, by receiving a Universality place from FINA, in an entry time of 29.83. She challenged seven other swimmers in heat three, including 13-year-old Tojohanitra Andriamanjatoarimanana of Madagascar. She posted a lifetime best of 29.47 to take a third seed by 0.14 of a second behind winner Ermelinda Zamba of Mozambique. Donde failed to advance into the semifinals, as she placed fifty-seventh overall out of 75 swimmers on the last day of preliminaries.

References

External links
 

1989 births
Living people
Kenyan female swimmers
Olympic swimmers of Kenya
Swimmers at the 2004 Summer Olympics
Kenyan female freestyle swimmers
21st-century Kenyan women